The eminentia conchae is crossed by a vertical ridge, the ponticulus, which gives attachment to the Auricularis posterior muscle.

References

External links

Ear
Muscles of the head and neck